Pļaviņas is a town in Aizkraukle Municipality in Latvia. The town is located on the Daugava river. The population in 2020 was 2,974. Latvian law defines the town of Pļaviņas as belonging partly to the Vidzeme region and partly to Latgale.

See also

List of cities in Latvia
Pļaviņas municipality

References 

 
Towns in Latvia
1927 establishments in Latvia
Governorate of Livonia
Aizkraukle Municipality
Vidzeme
Latgale